Harjinder Kaur (born 14 October 1996) is an Indian weightlifter. She won the bronze medal at the 2022 Commonwealth Games.

She also won the silver medal in 2021 Commonwealth Youth Games in 71 kg weight category.

References

1996 births
Living people
People from Patiala district
Indian female weightlifters
Weightlifters from Punjab, India
Sportswomen from Punjab, India
Weightlifters at the 2022 Commonwealth Games
Commonwealth Games bronze medallists for India
Commonwealth Games medallists in weightlifting
21st-century Indian women
Medallists at the 2022 Commonwealth Games